Joshua G. Evans (born June 27, 1983 in McComb, Mississippi) is an American politician and a former Republican member of the Tennessee House of Representatives representing District 66, from 2009 to 2015. He unsuccessfully ran for the Tennessee Senate's 21st District in 2014.

Education
Evans earned his BS in mass communication from Middle Tennessee State University.

State House elections
2012 Evans was challenged in the August 2, 2012 Republican Primary, winning with 4,286 votes (71.4%), and was unopposed for the November 6, 2012 General election, winning with 18,466 votes.
2006 When District 66 incumbent Democratic Representative Gene Davidson retired and left the seat open, Evans ran in the August 3, 2006 Republican Primary, winning with 2,114 votes (52.6%), but lost the November 7, 2006 General election to Democratic nominee Bob Bibb.
2008 Evans and Representative Bibb were both unopposed for their August 7, 2008 primaries, setting up a rematch; Evans won the November 4, 2008 General election with 13,983 votes (52.4%) against Representative Bibb.
2010 Evans was unopposed for the August 5, 2010 Republican Primary, winning with 7,039 votes, and won the November 2, 2010 General election with 10,941 votes (61.7%) against Democratic nominee Billy Paul Carneal.

Robertson County politics
After Carol Dugger resigned from the Robertson County Commission in April 2017, Evans sought to fill the vacancy. He was one of two candidates who requested to fill the seat. Evans secured the seat with a 13-7-3 vote from the commission. In January 2018, Evans announced his candidacy in the Robertson County mayoral election to succeed term-limited mayor Howard Bradley. He was defeated by Billy Vogle in the general election.

References

External links
Official page at the Tennessee General Assembly
Campaign site

Joshua Evans at Ballotpedia
Joshua G. Evans at the National Institute on Money in State Politics

1983 births
Living people
Republican Party members of the Tennessee House of Representatives
Middle Tennessee State University alumni
People from McComb, Mississippi
People from Greenbrier, Tennessee